Bossiaea bracteosa, commonly known as mountain leafless bossiaea, is a species of flowering plant in the family Fabaceae and is endemic to north-eastern Victoria, Australia. It is a dense shrub that often forms root suckers and has winged branches, winged and lobed cladodes, leaves reduced to small scales, and deep yellow flowers, often with red blotches.

Description

Taxonomy and naming
Bossiaea bracteosa was first formally described in 1864 by George Bentham in Flora Australiensis from an unpublished description by Ferdinand von Mueller from specimens he collected in the Australian Alps. The specific epithet (bracteosa) means "having many bracts.

There are five recently described species that were previously included in a wider circumscription of Bossiaea bracteosa:
Bossiaea bombayensis, on the Shoalhaven River near Braidwood, New South Wales
Bossiaea fragrans, Abercrombie Caves, New South Wales
Bossiaea grayi, Australian Capital Territory
Bossiaea milesiae, near the Brogo Dam, New South Wales 
Bossiaea vombata, Wombat State Forest, Victoria

Distribution and habitat

References

External links
Herbarium specimen at Royal Botanic Gardens Kew

Mirbelioids
bracteosa
Flora of Victoria (Australia)
Plants described in 1864
Taxa named by George Bentham